Sembiavarambal is a village in the Kumbakonam taluk of Thanjavur district, Tamil Nadu, India.

Demographics 

As per the 2001 census, Sembiavarambal had a total population of 1100. The sex ratio was 1.0267, with 543 males and 557 females. The literacy rate was 74.97%.

References 

 

Villages in Thanjavur district